Reggie Nalder (born Alfred Reginald Natzler; 4 September 1907 – 19 November 1991) was a prolific Austrian film and television character actor from the late 1940s to the early 1990s. His distinctive features—partially the result of disfiguring burns—together with a haunting style and demeanor led to his being called "The Face That Launched a Thousand Trips".

Life and career

Born in Vienna, Austria-Hungary, he was the son of actor and operetta singer Sigmund Natzler (1862–1913). He was a cousin of actresses and singers Grete Natzler and Hertha Natzler. As a young man he performed at second-rate Vienna theatres and from the 1930s in several cabarets in Paris. After World War II he worked for the German language service of the BBC.

Nalder is perhaps best remembered for his roles as an assassin in Alfred Hitchcock's 1956 remake of The Man Who Knew Too Much, the vampire Kurt Barlow in the 1979 TV adaptation of the Stephen King novel Salem's Lot, and the Andorian ambassador Shras in the Star Trek episode "Journey to Babel".

Nalder appeared (at the request of star Frank Sinatra) in a brief, uncredited role as a communist spymaster in John Frankenheimer's 1962 film The Manchurian Candidate. He also had a brief role in the 1981 Walt Disney film The Devil and Max Devlin. In an interview, Nalder claimed that he could not stand working with Bill Cosby, the star of the film. He described him as "a pig", as well as "rude, arrogant, and very untalented."

Nalder's television work also included episodes of the series 77 Sunset Strip, It Takes A Thief, Surfside Six, Boris Karloff's Thriller ("The Terror In Teakwood" and "The Return Of Andrew Bentley"), McCloud and I Spy. Nalder was also credited as "Detlef Van Berg" in the X rated films Dracula Sucks (1978) and Blue Ice (1985), but performed in no scenes of a pornographic nature.

Death
Nalder died of bone cancer in Santa Monica, California in 1991, aged 84.

Partial filmography

 Roxy and the Wonderteam (1938, directed by Johann von Vásáry) - Fußballer
 Jericho (1946, directed by Henri Calef)
 La colère des dieux (1947, directed by Karel Lamač)
 Dilemma of Two Angels (1948, directed by Maurice Tourneur) - Bébé
 Le signal rouge (1949, directed by Ernst Neubach)
 Adventures of Captain Fabian (1951, directed by William Marshall) - Constant
 Bluebeard (1951, directed by Christian-Jacque) - Captain of the guard
 Betrayed (1954, directed by Gottfried Reinhardt) - (uncredited)
 The Lovers of Lisbon (1955, directed by Henri Verneuil) - Le maître d'hôtel / Hotel Manager (uncredited)
 Les évadés (1955, directed by Jean-Paul Le Chanois) - Le gardien avec le chien (début du film) (uncredited)
 The Man Who Knew Too Much (1956, directed by Alfred Hitchcock) - Rien
 Liane, Jungle Goddess (1956, directed by Eduard von Borsody) - Viktor Schöninck
  (1958, directed by Gilles Grangier) - Dédé
  (1958, directed by Harald Reinl) - Sekretär Dewitz
 Liane, die Tochter des Dschungels (1961, directed by Hermann Leitner and Eduard von Borsody)
 The Spiral Road (1962, directed by Robert Mulligan) - Burubi
 Convicts 4 (1962, directed by Millard Kaufman) - Greer
 The Manchurian Candidate (1962, directed by John Frankenheimer) - Gomel (uncredited)
 The Day and the Hour (1963, directed by René Clément) - Le gestapiste
 Les saintes-nitouches (1963, directed by Pierre Montazel)
 Mark of the Devil (1970, directed by Michael Armstrong and Adrian Hoven) - Albino
 The Bird with the Crystal Plumage (1970, directed by Dario Argento) - Needles, Yellow Jacket Assassin (uncredited)
 Mark of the Devil Part II (1973, directed by Adrian Hoven) - Natas
 The Dead Don't Die (1975, directed by Curtis Harrington) - Perdido
 Fellini's Casanova (1976, directed by Federico Fellini) - Faulkircher
 Crash! (1977, directed by Charles Band) - Man at swap meet
 Zoltan, Hound of Dracula (1977, directed by Albert Band) - Veidt Smith
 Dracula Sucks (aka Lust At First Bite) (1979, directed by Phillip Marshak) - Dr. Van Helsing
 Seven (1979, directed by Andy Sidaris) - Ronald Kahala 'The Hermit'
 Salem's Lot (1979, directed by Tobe Hooper) - Kurt Barlow (1979) (uncredited)
 The Devil and Max Devlin (1981, directed by Steven Hilliard Stern) - Chairman of Devil's Council
 Blue Ice (1985, directed by Phillip Marshak) - Anton Stuttgart
 Jericho (1991, directed by Luis Alberto Lamata) - German conqueror (final film role)

References

External links

 
 

Austrian male film actors
Austrian male television actors
1907 births
1991 deaths
Male actors from Vienna
Deaths from cancer in California
20th-century Austrian male actors